Matz Bladhs is a Swedish dansband formed in Falkenberg in 1968.

Members
Conductor
Niclas Olén
Vocals
Hans Schmid (1981–1983)	
Göran Lindberg (1983–1991)	
Paul Sahlin (1991–2004)	
Göran Lindberg (2004–2010)	
Conny Nilsson (2010–present) - also guitar
Instruments
Lars Olof Karlsson (1987–present) - guitar - also backing vocals
Niclas Olén (2000–present) - keyboards
Sören Kenstam (2011–present) - drummer	
Håkan Nordling (2011–present) - saxophone, also guitar and flute

Albums
(Peak positions in Sverigetopplistan in brackets, wherever applicable)
1972: Bland blommor och blad
1974: På me' tröja och jeans
1977: Det var så länge se'n
1978: Min högsta önskan
1981: Leende dansmusik 81 
1982: Leende dansmusik 82
1983: Leende dansmusik 83 (SWE #50)
1984: Leende dansmusik 84 (SWE #37)
1985: Leende dansmusik 85 
1986: Leende dansmusik 86
1987: Leende dansmusik 87
1988: Leende dansmusik 88 (SWE #16)
1989: Leende dansmusik 89
1990: Leende dansmusik 90
1991: Leende dansmusik 91
1992: Leende dansmusik 92
1993: Leende dansmusik 93
1994: Leende dansmusik 94
1995: Leende dansmusik 95 (SWE #57)
1997: Leende dansmusik 97 (SWE #55)
1999: Tack för alla åren
2001: Leende dansmusik
2004: 20 gobitar 2005 (SWE #33)
2006: Godbitar 2006 (SWE #30)
2008: Ljus och värme - Matz Bladhs bästa låtar (SWE #60)
2009: Upp till dans
2009: Entré (SWE #44)
2012: Leende dansmusik 2012 (SWE #9)
2013: Leende dansmusik 2013 (SWE #9)
2014: Hem igen (SWE #4)
2018: Här och nu (SWE #20)

Svensktoppen songs
1987: Aj, aj, aj, jag svävar i det blå 
1987: Senorita 
1988: Lite blyg 
1992: Kärleken ska segra 
1993: I en gul luftballong 
1993/94: Livets stora gåta
1994: Klockorna ska ringa 
1994/95: Jag ska älska dig 
1995: En liten röd bukett 
1996: Vid Silverforsens strand 
1997: Den första dagen
1997: Som en ros i ett regn 
1998/99: Varje liten stjärna 
1999: Det faller ett regn
2000: Över Öresund 
2001: Sommar & sol

Failed to enter chart
1969: Har inte någon sett min brud 
1990: En dag i sänder 
1991: En kärleksaffär 
1999: Jag vet vad kärlek är

Citations

External links 

 Official website
 

Dansbands
Falkenberg
Musical groups established in 1968
1968 establishments in Sweden